The Devils Ride is a TV show centered on a fictional motorcycle riders' club based in San Diego, California that split into two groups because of tensions between its members. It airs on the Discovery Channel and premiered on May 8, 2012. Season 2 premiered on February 18, 2013. Season 3 premiered on February 4, 2014. After season 2, members of Laffing Devils split from the club and created the new rival Sinister Mob motorcycle club. Season 2 documented the turmoil within the Laffing Devils. Eventually the Laffing Devils and Sinister Mob butt heads and a biker war ensues.

Series overview

Episodes

Season 1 (2012)

Season 2 (2013)

Season 3 (2014)

References

External links
 

2012 American television series debuts
2014 American television series endings
2010s American reality television series
Discovery Channel original programming
Fictional motorcycle clubs